Theftbote, a misdemeanour, occurs when a crime victim accepts the return of stolen property or makes other arrangements with a felon in exchange for an agreement not to prosecute.  Such private deals were criminalized by Edward III, King of England, because they reduced fines and other forfeitures of property, which were an important part of the royal revenue.  Theftbote was one of the first misdemeanour offences to be enacted.

See also
Compounding a felony

References

English criminal law

Victimology
Sociology of law
Legal terminology